Kesgrave is a town and civil parish in the East Suffolk district of Suffolk, England. The town is close to both Ipswich and Woodbridge. Kesgrave forms part of the wider Ipswich Built-up area.

History
The area was recorded as Gressgrava in the Domesday Book, by the late 15th century its name had become Kesgrave.  Kesgrave remained a small agricultural settlement with just a church, inn and a few farmsteads for over 700 years.
In 1921 the population was only 103 housed in 20 dwellings. Since then great changes have taken place.

Kesgrave parish council officially adopted the title of a town in January 2000.

Schools
Kesgrave High School is a large 11-18 comprehensive co-educational school with nearly 2000 pupils. A study for Sustrans noted that 61% of the pupils cycled to the school. This is largely due to the installation of a large cycle lane through the local housing development and along the main road. The school actively encourages walking or cycling and provides bicycle storage facilities.

The five primary schools in the immediate vicinity of Kesgrave are Beacon Hill Primary School, Birchwood Primary School, Cedarwood Primary School the building of which was awarded a Civic Trust Award in 2003, Gorseland Primary School and Heath Primary School.

Kesgrave was home to a number of private day and boarding schools based at Kesgrave Hall

 St. Edmund's School (1946–1975)
 Kesgrave Hall School (1976–1993)
 Shawe Manor (1993)
 Ryes School (2004–2007)

Gallery

Notable residents
Lawrence Ward, former Serjeant at Arms of the British House of Commons.

See also
Sinks Valley, Kesgrave

References

External links
Kesgrave Community Portal
Photos of Kesgrave

Towns in Suffolk
Civil parishes in Suffolk
Ipswich Districts